Mesa College may refer to:

Mesa Community College, a public, two-year community college in Mesa, Arizona
Colorado Mesa University, a public, liberal-arts college in Grand Junction, Colorado; previously named as Mesa College, then Mesa State College
San Diego Mesa College, a public, two-year community college in San Diego, California